Ablak may refer to:

 Ablak (saint), a saint of the Ethiopian Orthodox Tewahedo Church
 Ablak, Emirdağ, a village in the district of Emirdağ, Afyonkarahisar Province, Turkey
 Ablak, İhsaniye, a village in the district of İhsaniye, Afyonkarahisar Province, Turkey